Nowe Lignowy  is a village in the administrative district of Gmina Kwidzyn, within Kwidzyn County, Pomeranian Voivodeship, in northern Poland.

Between 1772 and 1920 the area was part of Prussia and next Germany from 1871, after First Partition of Poland in 1772 to regaining independence by Poland 1918 and the Versailles agreements in 1919 (the village was located in the plebiscite area, where the majority voted for Poland). For the history of the region, see History of Pomerania.

References

Nowe Lignowy